Robert "Bob" D. Sharp is a retired United States Navy admiral who last served as the 7th Director of the National Geospatial-Intelligence Agency.

Early life
A native of San Jose, California, Sharp graduated from the University of the Pacific with a Bachelor of Arts in English and was commissioned through Officer Candidate School in 1988. He holds a Naval War College diploma and earned a Master of Science in National Resource Strategy from the Industrial College of the Armed Forces in 2008.

Naval career
From April 2016 to February 2019, Sharp served as Commander, Office of Naval Intelligence; and Director, National Maritime Intelligence-Integration Office. During his initial flag assignment he served as the Director for Intelligence (J2), United States Special Operations Command.

He is scheduled to retire from active duty.

Accolades
In addition to multiple personal, unit, and campaign awards, Sharp has been the recipient of the Vice Admiral Rufus L. Taylor award for excellence in instruction, the United States Army's Knowlton Award for Military Intelligence, the Rear Adm. Edwin T. Layton leadership award, and the Naval Intelligence Foundation award for excellence in operational intelligence support to the Fleet.

Awards and decorations

References

Directors of the National Geospatial-Intelligence Agency
University of the Pacific (United States) alumni
Living people
Trump administration personnel
Year of birth missing (living people)